Huang Hsin-Ping (born 10 September 1976) is a Taiwanese former sprinter who competed in the men's 100m competition at the 1996 Summer Olympics. He recorded a 10.70, not enough to qualify for the next round past the heats. His personal best is 10.41, set in 1995.

References

1976 births
Living people
Taiwanese male sprinters
Athletes (track and field) at the 1996 Summer Olympics
Olympic athletes of Taiwan
Athletes (track and field) at the 2002 Asian Games
Asian Games competitors for Chinese Taipei